Blood Runs Cold may refer to:

 Blood Runs Cold, a 2008 novel by Alex Barclay
 "Blood Runs Cold", a song by Jedi Mind Tricks from the 2000 album Violent by Design
 "Blood Runs Cold", a song by Def Leppard from the 1996 album Slang

See also
 My Blood Runs Cold, a 1965 American thriller